Protocobitis typhlops is a species of troglobitic loach endemic to Guangxi, China.

References

Cobitidae
Cave fish
Endemic fauna of Guangxi
Freshwater fish of China
Fish described in 1993
Taxonomy articles created by Polbot